Abdul Karim Ahmed (b. 5 February 1980 in Accra) is a Ghanaian footballer. He currently plays for FK Tønsberg.

Ahmed has formerly played for Real Sporting Club Accra, Kongsvinger IL (1998–2001) and Viking (2002), FK Tønsberg.

References

1980 births
Living people
Ghanaian footballers
Ghana under-20 international footballers
Eliteserien players
Kongsvinger IL Toppfotball players
Viking FK players
FK Tønsberg players
Ghanaian expatriate footballers
Expatriate footballers in Norway
Ghanaian expatriate sportspeople in Norway
Association football defenders